Brian Alexander Stokes (born September 7, 1979) is an American former professional baseball pitcher. He played for the Tampa Bay Devil Rays, New York Mets, and Los Angeles Angels of Anaheim of Major League Baseball.

Early life
Stokes was born in Montclair, California, and graduated from Jurupa Valley High School. He played college baseball at Riverside Community College in California.

Career
On October 2, 1998, Stokes was signed as an amateur free agent by the Tampa Bay Devil Rays. While with Princeton, he led the Appalachian League in games finished with 35. Stokes pitched his first complete game at Mudville on June 23, 2001, but lost the game. He played for Bakersfield during the  season, leading the team in wins (10) and strikeouts (154). He threw his first professional shutout on July 14 against San Jose. In , Stokes pitched for both Visalia (Single-A) and Montgomery (Double-A). A hamstring injury sidelined him for the month of July. He was recalled from Durham (Triple-A) on September 2, 2005.
Stokes made his major league debut on September 3, 2006. In 2007, Brian's 59 appearances were fourth among American League rookies.

New York Mets
On November 28, 2007, Stokes was sent from Tampa Bay to the New York Mets for cash considerations and was added to the Mets' 40-man roster. During spring training on the last day, he was designated for assignment. He started the season with the Mets Triple-A affiliate, the New Orleans Zephyrs. He was called up to the Mets on August 9, 2008, to start in place of injured starting pitcher, John Maine.

Los Angeles Angels
On January 22, 2010, Stokes was traded to the Los Angeles Angels of Anaheim for Gary Matthews, Jr.  He was released by the Angels on September 7, 2010 after making 16 appearances with an 8.10 ERA.

Toronto Blue Jays
On December 21, 2010, Stokes signed a minor league contract with an invitation to spring training with the Toronto Blue Jays.

On February 14, 2011, Stokes' contract was voided by the Blue Jays "due to the results of his physical".

Arizona Diamondbacks
Stokes signed a minor league contract with the Arizona Diamondbacks on August 1, 2011, and was assigned to the Triple-A Reno Aces.

References

External links

Baseball Almanac

Jurupa Valley, California
1979 births
Living people
Baseball players from California
Major League Baseball pitchers
Tampa Bay Devil Rays players
New York Mets players
Los Angeles Angels players
Princeton Devil Rays players
Charleston RiverDogs players
Bakersfield Blaze players
Orlando Rays players
Visalia Oaks players
Montgomery Biscuits players
Riverside City Tigers baseball players
Durham Bulls players
New Orleans Zephyrs players
Salt Lake Bees players
Sportspeople from San Bernardino County, California
Rancho Cucamonga Quakes players
Camden Riversharks players
Reno Aces players
People from Montclair, California